Croptilon rigidifolium, called the stiff-leaf scratchdaisy, is a North American species of flowering plants in the tribe Astereae within the family Asteraceae. It has been found in the US State of Texas and also in the Mexican State of Nuevo León.

Croptilon rigidifolium is an herb sometimes reaching a height of 150 cm (5 feet). Flower heads are yellow, with both ray florets and disc florets.

References

Flora of Texas
Plants described in 1965
Flora of Nuevo León
Astereae